WWOS (810 kHz) is an AM radio station broadcasting a Christian talk and teaching radio format, along with Southern gospel music. Licensed to Walterboro, South Carolina, it serves the Charleston metropolitan area. The station is currently owned by Grace Baptist Church of Orangeburg.

Because it shares the same frequency as clear-channel station WGY in Schenectady, New York, WWOS only operates during the daytime hours.  The station's programming is heard around the clock on co-owned WWOS-FM 91.9 in St. George, South Carolina.  WWOS-AM-FM are also simulcast on AM 710 WPOG in St. Matthews, South Carolina.

History
On August 23, 1962, the station first signed on as WQIZ.  It broadcast on 1300 kHz and was powered at 500 watts, as a daytimer.  Its original city of license was St. George, South Carolina.  In the 1970s, it moved to AM 810 and received a boost in power to 5,000 watts, but still limited to daytime hours only.  It played R&B music and was programmed for the African American community of Charleston and nearby communities.

WQIZ was sold in 2015 to the Grace Baptist Church of Orangeburg.  The station switched its call sign to WWOS and its new city of license became Walterboro.

References

External links
FCC History Cards for WWOS
 

WOS
Radio stations established in 1987
WOS